The Groves is a district of York, England.

The Groves may also refer to:

The Groves, an industrial area within the modern ward of Drypool, Kingston upon Hull, England

See also
 The Groves of Academe, a 1952 novel by American writer Mary McCarthy
The Grove (disambiguation)